Local elections was held in  Meycauayan City, Bulacan on May 10, 2010 within the Philippine general election. The voters will elect for the elective local posts in the city: the mayor, vice mayor, and ten councilors.

Mayoral and vice mayoral election
Incumbent Mayor Joan Alarilla is running for second term, along with her running mate Rafael Manzano Jr. She faced Salvador Violago Sr. and former mayor Adriano Daez.

Results
The candidates for mayor and vice mayor with the highest number of votes wins the seat; they are voted separately, therefore, they may be of different parties when elected.

Mayoral & Vice Mayoral Candidates
List of Candidates as of March 2010

Notes:
 The Liberal Party are in coalition with the party Aksyon Demokratiko of Sonia Roco.

Notes:
 The Liberal Party are in coalition with the party Aksyon Demokratiko of Sonia Roco.

City Council election
Election is via plurality-at-large voting: A voter votes for up to ten candidates, then the ten candidates with the highest number of votes are elected.

Notes:
 The Liberal Party are in coalition with the party Aksyon Demokratiko of Sonia Roco.

References

External links
Official website of the Commission on Elections

2010 Philippine local elections
Meycauayan
Elections in Meycauayan